The men's 200 metres was a track and field athletics event held as part of the Athletics at the 1912 Summer Olympics programme. It was the fourth appearance of the event, which has appeared at every edition of the Summer Olympics since the 1900 Summer Olympics. The competition was held on July 10, 1912, and on July 11, 1912. 61 runners from 19 nations competed. NOCs could enter up to 12 athletes. The event was won by Ralph Craig of the United States, the nation's third victory in four Games. Another American, Donald Lippincott, took silver. Great Britain earned its first medal in the 200 metres with Willie Applegarth's bronze.

Background

This was the fourth appearance of the event, which was not held at the first Olympics in 1896 but has been on the program ever since. None of the finalists from the 1908 Games returned. There was no clear favorite. None of the four different AAU champions since 1908 competed. Willie Applegarth of Great Britain was the 1912 AAA champion and closest thing to a favorite before the Games. American Ralph Craig had set the world record for 220 yards in 1910, won the eastern U.S. trials, and started out in Stockholm by winning the 100 metres.

Australasia, Bohemia, Chile, Japan, Portugal, and Russia each made their debut in the event. The United States made its fourth appearance, the only nation to have competed at each edition of the 200 metres to date.

Competition format

There were three rounds: quarterfinals, semifinals, and a final. The quarterfinals consisted of 18 heats of between 2 and 5 athletes each; the two fastest men in each heat advanced to the semifinals. There were 6 semifinals, each with 6 runners. In that round, only the top athlete advanced. The final had 6 runners.

The race was run on a 383-metre track.

Records

These were the standing world and Olympic records (in seconds) prior to the 1912 Summer Olympics.

* unofficial 220 yards (= 201.17 m)

** straight course

Schedule

Results

Quarterfinals

All quarterfinal heats were held on Wednesday, July 10, 1912.

Quarterfinal 1

Quarterfinal 2

Quarterfinal 3

Quarterfinal 4

Quarterfinal 5

Quarterfinal 6

Quarterfinal 7

Quarterfinal 8

Quarterfinal 9

Quarterfinal 10

Quarterfinal 11

Quarterfinal 12

Quarterfinal 13

Quarterfinal 14

Quarterfinal 15

Quarterfinal 16

Quarterfinal 17

Quarterfinal 18

Semifinals

All semi-finals were held on Wednesday, July 10, 1912.

Semifinal 1

Semifinal 2

Semifinal 3

Semifinal 4

Semifinal 5

Semifinal 6

Final

The final was held on Thursday, July 11, 1912.

References

Notes
 
 

Men's 0200 metres
200 metres at the Olympics